This is a list of cities Ariana Afghan Airlines flies to. The list includes the city and country name; the airport codes of the International Air Transport Association (IATA airport code) and the International Civil Aviation Organization (ICAO airport code); the airport name. Additionally, there are labels for airports that are the airline's hub and stations that have been terminated as well as future routes (as of June 2022):

List

References

Ariana Afghan Airlines